Amistades peligrosas is a Spanish daily mystery television series that originally aired from July 2006 to November 2006 on Cuatro. Its cast stars Miquel Fernández, Celia Freijeiro, Iván Morales, Daniel Grao, Carolina Cerezuela, Ismael Martínez and Mercedes Salazar.

Premise 
The fiction follows the intrigues and secrets of a group of former friends in their late 20s, who reunite 10 years after the unresolved death of a member of the gang (El Bola) in 1996.

Cast

Production and release 
Produced by Cuatro and BocaBoca, the series was already in development before Cuatro's start of broadcasting in November 2005. Directed by Pepa Sánchez-Biezma, Amistades peligrosas began filming in June 2006.  Cuatro programmed the first episode to be released in prime time, with a subsequent reschedule to the early afternoon slot afterwards. Consisting of 45 episodes, the season's broadcasting run on Cuatro spanned from 23 July to 25 November 2006, averaging about 453,000 viewers and a 4.5% audience share.

References 

Television series set in 2006
2000s Spanish drama television series
2006 Spanish television series debuts
2006 Spanish television series endings
Spanish-language television shows
Cuatro (TV channel) original programming
Television series by BocaBoca